"Brighter Than the Sun" is a song by American recording artist Colbie Caillat. It was written by Caillat and Ryan Tedder and produced by the latter. The song was released as the second single from Caillat's third studio album, All of You (2011). The song was released to digital download on May 23, 2011, through Universal Republic. The song received a positive reaction from music critics, who complimented its summer feel. The song is certified platinum in the United States and has been successful on many Billboard charts, including the Hot 100, where the song reached the top 50, the Adult Contemporary chart, where the song peaked at number one for a week. "Brighter Than the Sun" also was a top-40 hit in Austria and was the third-biggest song of 2012 on US adult contemporary radio.

Composition
The song, which Caillat co-wrote with hit-maker and OneRepublic frontman Ryan Tedder, is the second single from her third LP All of You. Caillat talked about her decision to put her new single at the top of the All of You track list: "I usually like to start my albums by easing my way in. But 'Brighter Than the Sun' has a punch. It's so up-tempo and happy. My manager actually requested that it be No. 1, and he was right. This song is awesome because it just gets people started right away and interested in what's next. A different instrument leads into each part of the song. It never stays the same, which keeps listeners wanting to hear what's next."

Caillat says she wrote all the tracks on All of You about her relationship with Justin Young, who plays guitar in her band: "He was in my band for two years before we noticed that we like each other. I wrote most of this album about us, our ups and downs."

The lyrics reflect the tumble into love: "Boy, we go together like peanuts and Paydays/ Marley and Reggae/ And everybody needs to get a chance to say/ Oh, this is how it starts/ Lightning strikes the heart/ It goes off like a gun/ Brighter than the sun."

Critical reception
Amy Sciaretto from Artist Direct was positive, considering it "bright, airy, whisper-light, sweet and beachy!". She also loves "how she makes people feel warm and reminds of the ocean when  listen to her tunes". Robbie Daw wrote for Idolator that Colbie Caillat has served up an upbeat, infectious new single, just in time for summer. Kyle Anderson wrote for Entertainment Weekly positively that "Caillat plays with rhythmic touches (the high-spirited handclaps on Brighter Than the Sun)." Lavina Suthenthiran from MTV News said that 'Brighter Than the Sun' is a fresh tune marrying warm vocals and acoustics but is a bit pacier than Bubbly and is bound to get you all in that summer mood." Chris Willman from Chicago Tribune thought that even with a variety of producers, the album style does not change, saying that the song "has the kind of quickly strummed acoustic guitars and handclaps that suggest somebody's been ingesting some "Me and Julio Down by the Schoolyard." Sputnikmusic said that the song "warrants attention, offering up Colbie's only real successful landing on her targeted 'new' sound. The expanded presence of drums, tambourines, and handclaps all create the desired 'tropical' effect that she obviously yearned to either maintain or further enliven with her newest LP."

Chart performance
The song debuted at number ninety on the Billboard Hot 100. As of the week of February 4, 2012, "Brighter Than the Sun" has reached number 47. The single has spent twenty-six weeks inside the Hot 100 chart, thereby becoming her best performing song since "I Never Told You" of 2010 due to its longevity on the chart. The song has proved to be a hit, so far, on the adult contemporary charts. On the Adult Pop Songs, the song has peaked at number two, so far, becoming one of her most successful singles on the adult pop charts, alongside "Fallin' for You" and only behind "Bubbly". On the Adult Contemporary chart, the song has peaked at number one, becoming her third-single to top the chart. On the Pop Songs chart, the song has peaked at number thirty-nine and is the first of the album to chart and her most successful single since "Fallin' for You" (2009). Similar with the Pop Songs chart, the song has been also moderately well on the Radio Songs, peaking at thirty-eight, so far.

Music video
A teaser of the music video was released on June 13, 2011. The video was filmed in the appropriately sunny Playa Del Rey beachside community of Los Angeles. The production is inspired on the nature scenes, such as flowers, fruits and a bed full of green gram. The video premiered on June 30, 2011. In the video, Colbie appears surrounded by her circle of friends. Next, a green fern gets a 10-second close-up, followed by a tight shot of Colbie's hands planting sheets of grass. Colbie proceeds to twirl in front of her orange tree and reveals her swing, until a dance party is produced.
Jenna Hally Rubenstein from MTV Buzzworthy said sarcastically that the video is "the hottest, most environmentally conscious party of the summer so far."

Live performances
Caillat performed the song on the Today Show on July 12, 2011 and on The Tonight Show with Jay Leno two days later. Caillat was the featured musical guest on the So Random! episode "Colbie Caillat" on August 14, 2011, where she performed the song. In her So Random! performance, she had to change the lyric "so damn beautiful" to "so so beautiful". Caillat performed the song on Live with Regis & Kelly show on September 27, 2011. Caillat went to Lopez Tonight to perform the track on October 1, 2011.

Charts and certifications

Weekly charts

Year-end charts

Certifications

References

Colbie Caillat songs
2011 singles
Song recordings produced by Ryan Tedder
Songs written by Colbie Caillat
Songs written by Ryan Tedder